The Iwagaki oyster (Magallana nippona),  is an oyster native to Japan.  It was first described in 1934.

Etymology 
The genus Magallana is named for the Portuguese explorer Ferdinand Magellan and its specific epithet nippona is for "Japanese". It was previously placed in the genus Crassostrea; from the Latin crass meaning "thick", ostrea meaning "oyster", and Crassostrea nippona is considered by part of the scientific community to be the proper denomination as an accepted alternative in WoRMS,

References

Magallana
Invertebrates of Japan
Molluscs described in 1934